Elizabeth Mettam (born 3 May 1977) is an Australian politician. She has been the Liberal member for Vasse in the Western Australian Legislative Assembly since a by-election held on 18 October 2014. She is the leader of the Western Australian Liberal Party since January 2023 and was the deputy leader of the party from December 2020 to January 2023. In the election, she was one of only two Liberal lower house MLAs to retain their seat, the other being  David Honey.

Early life
Mettam was born on 3 May 1977 in Subiaco, Western Australia. She is the daughter of Jenny and Peter Hansen-Knarhoi.

Mettam briefly lived in Kalgoorlie as a child before her family settled in Geraldton, where her father worked as a biochemist. She attended Bluff Point Primary School and Geraldton Senior High School, before going on to study broadcasting at the Western Australian Academy of Performing Arts (WAAPA). She holds a Bachelor of Arts from WAAPA and a Master of Public Administration from Curtin University.

Journalism career
Mettam worked for Channel 7 Perth as a researcher on Today Tonight from 1999 to 2001. She subsequently moved to Adelaide for a year where her husband was study winemaking, during which time she worked part-time on A Current Affair. She then settled in Dunsborough, Western Australia, and became a producer with ABC South West WA. She later worked as a freelance journalist for Instyle Publishing and as a publicist with CinefestOZ.

Politics
Mettam joined the Dunsborough branch of the Liberal Party in 2006 and worked for Liberal MP Barry House for ten years as an electorate officer. She was elected to the Western Australian Legislative Assembly at the 2014 Vasse state by-election, retaining the seat of Vasse for the Liberal Party following the resignation of former party leader Troy Buswell.

Personal life
Mettam has two daughters with her husband Jonathan, a winemaker, whom she met while working together at the Albion Hotel, Cottesloe.

See also
2020 Liberal Party of Australia (Western Australian Division) leadership election

References

External links

WA Parliament biography

1977 births
Living people
Liberal Party of Australia members of the Parliament of Western Australia
Members of the Western Australian Legislative Assembly
Edith Cowan University alumni
Curtin University alumni
Place of birth missing (living people)
21st-century Australian politicians
21st-century Australian women politicians
Women members of the Western Australian Legislative Assembly
Women deputy opposition leaders